Gallium compounds are compounds containing the element gallium. These compounds are found primarily in the +3 oxidation state. The +1 oxidation state is also found in some compounds, although it is less common than it is for gallium's heavier congeners indium and thallium. For example, the very stable GaCl2 contains both gallium(I) and gallium(III) and can be formulated as GaIGaIIICl4; in contrast, the monochloride is unstable above 0 °C, disproportionating into elemental gallium and gallium(III) chloride. Compounds containing Ga–Ga bonds are true gallium(II) compounds, such as GaS (which can be formulated as Ga24+(S2−)2) and the dioxan complex Ga2Cl4(C4H8O2)2.

Aqueous chemistry 

Aqueous solutions of gallium(III) salts contain the hydrated gallium ion, . Gallium(III) hydroxide, may be precipitated from gallium(III) solutions by adding ammonia. Dehydrating  at 100 °C produces gallium oxide hydroxide, GaO(OH).

Alkaline hydroxide solutions dissolve gallium, forming gallate salts (not to be confused with identically named gallic acid salts) containing the  anion. Gallium hydroxide, which is amphoteric, also dissolves in alkali to form gallate salts. Although earlier work suggested  as another possible gallate anion, it was not found in later work.

Oxides and chalcogenides 

Gallium reacts with the chalcogens only at relatively high temperatures. At room temperature, gallium metal is not reactive with air and water because it forms a passive, protective oxide layer. At higher temperatures, however, it reacts with atmospheric oxygen to form gallium(III) oxide, .

Gallium(III) sulfide, has 3 possible crystal modifications. It can be made by the reaction of gallium with hydrogen sulfide at 950 °C. Alternatively,  can be used at 747 °C:
2  + 3  →  + 6 

Strong acids decompose these salts, releasing  in the process. The mercury salt, can be used as a phosphor.

Gallium also forms sulfides in lower oxidation states, such as gallium(II) sulfide and the green gallium(I) sulfide, the latter of which is produced from the former by heating to 1000 °C under a stream of nitrogen.

They are all semiconductors but are easily hydrolysed and have limited utility.

Nitrides and pnictides 

Gallium reacts with ammonia at 1050 °C to form gallium nitride, GaN. Gallium also forms binary compounds with phosphorus, arsenic, and antimony: gallium phosphide (GaP), gallium arsenide (GaAs), and gallium antimonide (GaSb). These compounds have the same structure as ZnS, and have important semiconducting properties. GaP, GaAs, and GaSb can be synthesized by the direct reaction of gallium with elemental phosphorus, arsenic, or antimony. They exhibit higher electrical conductivity than GaN. GaP can also be synthesized by reacting  with phosphorus at low temperatures.

Gallium forms ternary nitrides; for example:
 +  → 

These compounds are easily hydrolyzed by dilute acids and water.

Halides 

It is an ionic compound strongly insoluble in water. However, it dissolves in hydrofluoric acid, in which it forms an adduct with water, . Attempting to dehydrate this adduct forms . The adduct reacts with ammonia to form , which can then be heated to form anhydrous .

Gallium trichloride is formed by the reaction of gallium metal with chlorine gas.

Like the other group 13 trihalides, gallium(III) halides are Lewis acids, reacting as halide acceptors with alkali metal halides to form salts containing  anions, where X is a halogen.

When heated to a high temperature, gallium(III) halides react with elemental gallium to form the respective gallium(I) halides. For example,  reacts with Ga to form :
2 Ga +   3 GaCl (g)

GaCl can also be produced by reacting Ga with HCl at 950 °C; the product can be condensed as a red solid.

Gallium(I) compounds can be stabilized by forming adducts with Lewis acids. For example:
GaCl +  → 

The so-called "gallium(II) halides", are actually adducts of gallium(I) halides with the respective gallium(III) halides, having the structure . For example:
GaCl +  →

Hydrides 

Like aluminium, gallium also forms a hydride, known as gallane, which may be produced by reacting lithium gallanate with gallium(III) chloride at −30 °C:
3  +  → 3 LiCl + 4 

If no solvent is used, the dimer  (digallane) is formed as a gas. Its structure is similar to diborane, having two hydrogen atoms bridging the two gallium centers, unlike α- in which aluminium has a coordination number of 6.

Gallane is unstable above −10 °C, decomposing to elemental gallium and hydrogen.

Organogallium compounds 

Organogallium compounds are of similar reactivity to organoindium compounds, less reactive than organoaluminium compounds, but more reactive than organothallium compounds. Alkylgalliums are monomeric. Lewis acidity decreases in the order Al > Ga > In and as a result organogallium compounds do not form bridged dimers as organoaluminium compounds do. Organogallium compounds are also less reactive than organoaluminium compounds. They do form stable peroxides. These alkylgalliums are liquids at room temperature, having low melting points, and are quite mobile and flammable. Triphenylgallium is monomeric in solution, but its crystals form chain structures due to weak intermolecluar Ga···C interactions.

Gallium trichloride is a common starting reagent for the formation of organogallium compounds, such as in carbogallation reactions. Gallium trichloride reacts with lithium cyclopentadienide in diethyl ether to form the trigonal planar gallium cyclopentadienyl complex GaCp3. Gallium(I) forms complexes with arene ligands such as hexamethylbenzene. Because this ligand is quite bulky, the structure of the [Ga(η6-C6Me6)]+ is that of a half-sandwich. Less bulky ligands such as mesitylene allow two ligands to be attached to the central gallium atom in a bent sandwich structure. Benzene is even less bulky and allows the formation of dimers: an example is [Ga(η6-C6H6)2] [GaCl4]·3C6H6.

See also 
 Organogallium chemistry
 :Category:Gallium compounds

References 

Gallium compounds
Chemical compounds by element